Saman may refer to:

Places

Iran
 Saman, Chaharmahal and Bakhtiari, a city in Chaharmahal and Bakhtiari Province
 Saman, Hamadan, a city in Hamadan Province
 Saman, Ilam, a village in Ilam Province
 Saman, Kurdistan, a village in Kurdistan Province
 Saman, Markazi, a village in Markazi Province
 Saman, Razavi Khorasan, a village in Razavi Khorasan Province
 Saman District (Iran), an administrative subdivision
 Saman Rural District, an administrative subdivision

Elsewhere
 Saman District, an administrative subdivision of Peru
 Saman, Rewa, a village in Rewa district in Madhya Pradesh, India

Other uses
 Saman (name), a list of people with the given name or surname
 Saman (Deus Ex), a fictional character in the video game Deus Ex: Invisible War
 Saman (deity), a prominent Sri Lankan deity
 Saman (novel), a novel by Ayu Utami
 Saman, an album by Icelandic cellist Hildur Guðnadóttir
 Saman dance, an Indonesian traditional dance
 , a Maltese oil tanker in service 2008–12
 Saman tree, Albizia saman

See also
 Samen, a city in Hamadan Province, Iran